The Panhandle–Pecos Valley League was a minor league baseball league that played in the 1923 season. The Class D level Panhandle–Pecos Valley League featured four teams based in New Mexico and Texas. The league permanently folded during its first season of play, with the Lubbock Hubbers capturing the only championship of the short–lived league.

History
The Panhandle–Pecos Valley League was formed for the 1923 season as a Class D level minor league. The league president was S.D. Hunter. The  Panhandle–Pecos Valley League evolved from the 1922 eight–team West Texas League, as three members became the foundation of the Panhandle-Pecos Valley League. The 1923 Panhandle–Pecos Valley League began play as a four–team league, hosting franchises from Amarillo, Texas (Amarillo Gassers), Clovis, New Mexico (Clovis Cubs), Lubbock, Texas (Lubbock Hubbers) and Roswell, New Mexico (Roswell Giants). Amarillo, Colvis and Lubbock had played in the 1922 West Texas League.

The Panhandle–Pecos Valley League began play on May 8, 1923 with a split–season schedule. The league permanently disbanded on August 15, 1923. The overall standings were led by the Amarillo Gassers (62–42), followed by the Lubbock Hubbers (57–47), Clovis Cubs (48–56) and Roswell Giants (41–63). Lubbock won the first half pennant and Clovis won the second half pennant. Amarillo was also named a playoff qualifier and the league did hold a nine–game playoff, which was won by the Lubbock Hubbers 5 games to 4 over the Amarillo Gassers.

Panhandle–Pecos Valley League teams

Standings & statistics
1923 Panhandle–Pecos Valley League

References

External links
Baseball Reference

Defunct minor baseball leagues in the United States
Baseball leagues in Texas
Baseball leagues in New Mexico
Defunct professional sports leagues in the United States
Sports leagues established in 1923
Sports leagues disestablished in 1923